Syria (SYR) competed at the 1987 Mediterranean Games in Latakia, Syria. Their total medal tally was 27.

Nations at the 1987 Mediterranean Games
1987
Mediterranean Games